Prafullah Kumar Das (born ) was the Chief Minister of Tripura state of India from 1 April 1977 to 25 July 1977.

References

1930s births
Living people
Chief Ministers of Tripura
Tripura politicians
Indian National Congress politicians
Congress for Democracy politicians
Tripura MLAs 1972–1977